Kenji Uchino is an American electronics engineer, physicist, academic, inventor and industry executive. He is currently a Professor of Electrical Engineering at Pennsylvania State University, where he also directs the International Center for Actuators and Transducers at Materials Research Institute. He is the former Associate Director (US Navy Ambassador to Japan) at The US Office of Naval Research – Global Tokyo Office.

Uchino has conducted extensive research on solid state physics, focusing especially on ferroelectrics and piezoelectrics. He is one of the pioneers in piezoelectric actuators and electro-optic displays and is the inventor of topics including lead magnesium niobate (PMN)-based electrostricive materials, cofired multilayer piezoelectric actuators, superior electromechanical coupling relaxor-PbTiO_3 single crystals, magnetoelectric laminated composite sensors, shape memory ceramics, and micro ultrasonic motors. Uchino’s work has resulted in over 584 research papers, over 78 books and 33 patents in the ceramic actuator area.

Uchino is a Fellow of IEEE and American Ceramic Society and a senior member of National Academy of Inventors. He chaired the Smart Actuators/Sensors Study Committee in Japan from 1987 till 2014. Uchino is the Editor in Chief of Insight-Material Science and the Associate Editor in Chief of Actuators.

Early life and education 
Uchino was born in Tokyo in 1950, and grew up in Hiroshima. He studied at Tokyo Institute of Technology in Japan and completed his B.Sc. degree in Physics in 1973. He then received his M.S. and Ph.D. degree in Physical Electronics in 1975 and 1981, respectively. He was awarded his MBA degree from Saint Francis University in 2008.

Career
Uchino taught as an assistant professor at Tokyo Institute of Technology and the Pennsylvania State University from 1976 till 1985 before joining Sophia University in Japan as an Associate Professor of Physics. In 1991, he was appointed by the Pennsylvania State University as Professor at Electrical Engineering and Materials Research Institute. Uchino was appointed as Founding Director of International Center for Actuators and Transducers in 1992. He served as a distinguished honors faculty at Schreyer Honors College at Pennsylvania State University from 2018 till 2020.

Uchino was appointed as a Standing Auditor of Tokyo Savor Electronics Co. in the 1990s. He has also served as Deputy Director of System Technology Laboratory at NF Corporation in Japan. He was also the Founder and Senior Vice President & CTO of Micromechatronics Inc., State College.

From 2010 till 2014, he served as an Associate Director of Asia Office at Office of Naval Research-Global in Japan.

Research
Uchino is one of the pioneers in piezoelectric actuators and electro-optic display. He has conducted research on solid state physics, focusing especially on ferroelectrics and piezoelectrics, as well as on application development of solid state actuators for precision positioners, ultrasonic motors, smart structures, piezoelectric transformers and energy harvesting.

Materials developments
Uchino, along with his team, was the first to discover the giant electro-strictive effect in lead magnesium niobate based relaxor ferroelectric materials. His discovery led to the 'smart actuator' boom. He has also contributed significantly to the single crystal growth of piezoelectric transducer materials, and is one of the discoverers of the highest electromechanical coupling factor of 95% in lead zinc niobate - lead titanate single crystals.

Uchino reported the existence of the critical particle size below which all ferroelectric ceramics will lose ferro-electricity. His work led to triggering of later micro/nanotechnology research in the ferroelectric field, specifically in thin film applications.

Uchino contributed to the fundamental phenomenology in relaxor ferroelectrics and proposed a modified Curie-Weiss Law in the early 1980s.

Uchino discovered 'photostrictive effect' and by combining the photovoltaic effect and piezoelectricity, he invented photo-driven actuators. He investigated the basic ceramic compositions in La-doped lead zirconate titanate (PLZT).

Uchino has also worked on high power density piezo-ceramics, and developed a new methodology on measuring three losses separately in piezoelectrics. He also developed practical high power piezo-materials with the maximum vibration velocity.

Device designing
Uchino proposed the basic idea of co-fired multilayer actuators in late 1970s which led to the mass-production of piezoelectric multilayer actuators by NEC Corporation. He is also the inventor of Cymbal actuators that consist of a thin multilayer piezoelectric element and two metal end caps with narrow cymbal-shaped cavities bonded together.

In collaboration with Denso Corporation in Japan, Uchino worked on piezoelectric energy harvesting with cymbal transducers from the engine vibration in a car. His work was recognized with an Inventor Award from Center for Energy Harvesting Materials and Systems.

Uchino has also worked on compact ultrasonic motors with the minimum components. His original design consisted of only two basic components, and guaranteed reduction of manufacturing cost and improvement of production efficiency and reliability. He combined magnetostrictor and piezoelectric materials and is one of the pioneers in magnetoelectric devices.

Drive/Control techniques
Uchino reported the analysis of transient vibration generated by a piezoelectric actuator after applying a pulse voltage. He proposed the idea of health monitoring of piezoelectric actuators by using AE monitoring and/or strain gauge type internal electrodes. He based his idea on the crack propagation mechanisms in multilayer piezo-actuators.

Uchino designed Buck-Converters for resolving the issue of energy harvesting circuit for realizing piezoelectric energy harvesting systems.

Awards and honors
1987 - Best Paper Award, Japanese Society of Oil/Air Pressure Control
1993 - Honorary Membership of KERAMOS 
1997 - Fellow of American Ceramics Society
2005 - Adaptive Structures Prize, American Society of Mechanical Engineers
2007 - R&D 100 Award
2007 - Smart Product Implementation Award, Society of Photo-Optical Instrumentation Engineers
2008 - Outstanding Academic Book Award for ‘’Micromechatronics’’, Japanese Society of Applied Electromagnetics and Mechanics 
2010 - Editorial Board Award for Life long contribution to the Editorial Board of Japanese Journal of Applied Physics, Japanese Applied Physics Society.
2011 - Premier Research Award, Penn State Engineering Alumni Society
2011 - Inventor Award for “Piezoelectric Energy Harvesting System”, Center for Energy Harvesting Materials and Systems, Virginia Tech
2012 - Fellow of IEEE
2013 - Recognition Award, IEEE/UFFC Ferroelectrics
2016 - International Ceramic Award, Global Academy of Ceramics
2017 - Distinguished Lecturer of the IEEE UFFC Society
2019 - Wilhelm R. Buessem Award, Center for Dielectrics and Piezoelectrics, Penn State University

Bibliography

Selected books
Piezoelectric Actuators and Ultrasonic Motors (1997) 
Ferroelectric devices (2000)   2nd Edition (2010) 
MicroMechatronics (2003)  2nd Edition (2020) 
FEM and Micromechatronics with ATILA Software (2008) 
High-Power Piezoelectrics and Loss Mechanisms (2020) 
Entrepreneurship for Engineers (2009)  
Global Crisis and Sustainability Technologies (2017)

Selected articles
Uchino, K., & Nomura, S. (1982). Critical exponents of the dielectric constants in diffused-phase-transition crystals. Ferroelectrics, 44(1), 55-61.
Uchino, K., Sadanaga, E., & Hirose, T. (1989). Dependence of the crystal structure on particle size in barium titanate. Journal of the American Ceramic Society, 72(8), 1555-1558.
Kuwata, J., Uchino, K., & Nomura, S. (1982). Dielectric and piezoelectric properties of 0.91 Pb (Zn1/3Nb2/3) O3-0.09 PbTiO3 single crystals. Japanese Journal of Applied Physics, 21(9R), 1298.
Ryu, J., Carazo, A. V., Uchino, K., & Kim, H. E. (2001). Magnetoelectric properties in piezoelectric and magnetostrictive laminate composites. Japanese Journal of Applied Physics, 40(8R), 4948.
Ryu, J., Priya, S., Uchino, K., & Kim, H. E. (2002). Magnetoelectric effect in composites of magnetostrictive and piezoelectric materials. Journal of electroceramics, 8(2), 107-119.

References 

Fellow Members of the IEEE
Living people
Japanese electronics engineers
1950 births
Pennsylvania State University faculty
Tokyo Institute of Technology alumni
Saint Francis University alumni